Thelymitra batesii, commonly called the plump sun orchid, is a species of orchid that is endemic to South Australia. It has a single fleshy, channelled, dark green leaf and up to eight mauve to bluish purple flowers that are pinkish with darker stripes on the back. The unopened flower buds are distinctly plump.

Description
The lobe on the top of the anther is dark purplish with a yellow tip, curved sharply forwards and deeply lobed. The side lobes have dense, mop-like tufts of white hairs. Flowering occurs from September to December.

Taxonomy and naming
Thelymitra batesii was first formally described in 2004 by Jeff Jeanes and the description was published in Muelleria from a specimen collected in the Spring Gully Conservation Park. The specific epithet (batesii) honours Robert John Bates in recognition of his knowledge of Australian orchids.

Distribution and habitat
The plump sun orchid is widespread and locally common in the Northern Lofty and Southern Lofty biogeographic regions where it grows in heathy woodland and forest.

References

batesii
Endemic orchids of Australia
Orchids of South Australia
Plants described in 2004